Ernie Johnson may refer to:

People
Ernie Johnson (American football) (1926–2010), American college athlete at UCLA
Ernie Johnson (jockey) (born 1948), British flat racing jockey
Ernie Johnson (shortstop) (1888–1952), American professional baseball shortstop
Ernie Johnson Jr. (born 1956), American sportscaster, son of the pitcher
Ernie Johnson Sr. (1924–2011), American professional baseball pitcher and sportscaster
Moose Johnson (1886–1963), also known as Ernie, Canadian ice hockey defenceman

Fictional characters
Ernie Johnson, a character in EastEnders

See also
Ernest Johnson (disambiguation)